Astún  is a ski resort situated  near the town of Canfranc in the High Aragon of the western Pyrenees (province of Huesca, Spain). The source of the Aragon River is in the resort. Ibón de Truchas attracts anglers. It is connected to the city by 33 km of the N -330. At his feet is the urbanization of the tracks, which had 6 inhabitants in 2012.

The resort
It has 39 km of marked pistes, it is one of the most modern resorts of the Pyrenees. The highest point is La Raca peak, 2300 m AMSL, with a vertical drop of 600 m.

The base of the resort is a purpose-built town which includes several hotels and apartments and is situated at 1700 m AMSL. From there the main chair lifts provide access for the resort. The resort itself occupies two different high mountain valleys, defining two sectors: La Raca - Sarrios, and Truchas. Each sector is accessed from the base of the resort using a chair lift.

Astún offers a joint ski pass with the neighbouring resort of Candanchú.

Lifts
Almost all of the resort's lifts are modern and of high capacity, the resort has:

 6 chair lifts.
 7 ski tows.

Pistes
The resort offers 48 pistes of different difficulties:

 3 beginners. 
  14 easy.
  22 intermediate.
  9 expert.

Services

 8 restaurants.
 3 skiing school.
 1 snow gardens for children.
 1 kindergarten
 4 ski hiring stores.

External links
 http://www.astun.com - Official resort site.

Ski areas and resorts in Aragon
Pyrenees